Home Minister is a 2022 Indian Kannada-language action comedy film written and directed by Sujay K. Shrihari and produced by Poorna Naidu. The cinematography done by Ramesh Babu.  The film stars Upendra, Vedhika, Tanya Hope, Suman Ranganathan and Aadhya.

Premise
Renuka Prasad aka Renu is a homemaker living with his wife Surekha, an investigative reporter and daughter Kundana at an apartment complex. When Renu loses  which was entrusted by Surekha for her father's operation. Why did Renu took responsibility as a homemaker and whether he would recover the money forms the rest of the plot.

Cast 
Upendra as Renuka Prasad
Vedhika as Surekha	
Tanya Hope as Jessie	
Suman Ranganathan
Abhimanyu Singh
Avinash as Renuka's Father
Sadhu Kokila
Suman
Vijay Chendoor
Tilak Shekar

Soundtrack 
The soundtrack album has five singles composed by Ghibran, and released on Anand Audio.

Release
The film was released on 1 April 2022.

References

External links 
 

Indian action drama films
2020s Kannada-language films
2022 films
Films shot in Karnataka
Indian gangster films